Kabzaa is a 2023 Indian Kannada-language period action film written and directed by R. Chandru. The film features an ensemble cast of Upendra, Shiva Rajkumar, Kiccha Sudeepa, Shriya Saran, Sudha, Murali Sharma, Nawab Shah, Suneel Puranik, John Kokken, Dev Gill, Kabir Duhan Singh, Danish Akhtar Saifi, Kota Srinivasa Rao and Posani Krishna Murali. In the film, Arakeshwara, an air force officer enters the underworld due to unavoidable circumststances and the story revolves between 1942 to 1986.

Kabzaa was released on March 17, 2023, in Kannada, along with the dubbed versions of Hindi, Tamil, Telugu and Malayalam.

Plot 
During the British rule in 1945, Amareshwara, a freedom fighter, gets brutally killed by the British.  His wife, Tulasi Devi, and sons, Arkeshwara and Sankeshwara, relocate to Amarapura and work as flag sellers. In 1971, Arkeshwara becomes an air force pilot, while Sankeshwara sacrifices his aspirations of joining the Air Force for his brother.  Arkeshwara returns to Amarapura for a short holiday, where he spends time with his mother and girlfriend, Madhumati, who is the daughter of the royal heir, Veer Bahaddur. 

Amarapura is always involved in gang wars between three gangsters: Khaleed, Bagheera, and Malik. When CM Ghanshyam Pandey learns about Veer Bahaddur's plan to nominate himself as a candidate for the CM, he hires Khaleed to create chaos in Amarapura, along with his son, Sartaaj. Sartaaj begins the chaos until Sankeshwara kills him for shooting an old woman. Enraged, Khaleed kills and beheads Sankeshwara, which disturbs Arkeshwara and Tulasi. An enraged Arkeshwara later kills a police officer for insulting his family, upon which he is sentenced to prison and expelled from the Air Force. Khaleed hires a dreaded gangster, Bali, in the jail, to kill Arkeshwara.  However, Arkeshwara kills Bali.  

Sensing an opportunity to get rid of Khaleed, Veer Bahaddur bails out Arkeshwara. Khaleed organises a hit against Arkeshwara, but Arkeshwara finishes Khaleed's men and kills Khaleed, thus seeking justice in Sankeshwara's death and marking his foray into becoming the next crime boss of the Bangalore underworld. However, trouble ensues for Arkeshwara, as he has to deal with Malik and Bagheera. Veer Bahaddur wins the election and becomes the CM. Madhumati informs her decision to him on marrying Arkeshwara, but Veer Bahaddur disrespects her decision and Arkeshwara, leading her to elope with him. Arkeshwara kills Bagheera and Malik, and occupies their empire. He becomes a dreaded gangster overnight.

In 1973, Arakeshwara leads a family life with Madhumati, their two children, and his mother. DSP Vikram tries to arrest Arkeshwara, but is later killed by him. On their wedding anniversary, Madhumati heads to Veer Bahaddur for reconcilation, but he holds her captive in a cell and tells her about how he used Arkeshwara as a weapon, to destroy Bagheera, Khaleed, and Malik. He also reveals to her that he tried to get DSP Vikram arrest Arkeshwara, but to no avail, as he died at the hands of Arkeshwara. Veer Bahaddur then separates Madhumati from her sons and proceeds to burn them alive. 

Meanwhile, Arkeshwara gets worried about Madhumati and their children. He calls up Veer Bahaddur to find about their whereabouts, but later gets surrounded by the ruthless cop, Bhargava Bakshi, along with his battalion. Just as he is about to retaliate against them, a mysterious gangster named Siddhantha arrives with his gang and aims his weapons at both Bakshi and Arkeshwara, ordering them to be fired, leading to a sequel.

Cast

Production 
The film's shoot was stopped due to COVID-19 pandemic and it was resumed in March 2021. Meanwhile Asha Bhat was joined the cast in 2022. Meantime actor Nawab Shah joined the shoot on October 2021 and later Sudeep joined the sets on December 2021. The film marks the debut of Murali Sharma in Kannada. The team later announced that Shiva Rajkumar has done a cameo appearance in the film.

Music 
The music of the film is composed by Ravi Basrur. The first single titled "Kabzaa Title Track" was released on 4 February 2023. The second single titled "Namaami Namaami" was released on 16 February 2023. The third single titled "Chum Chum Chali Chali" was released on 26 February 2023.

Marketing 
The motion poster of the film was released on the birthday of Upendra on 18 September 2021. The film's teaser was released on September 2022.

Release

Theatrical 
Kabzaa was theatrically released on 17 March 2023 in Kannada alongside Tamil, Telugu, Hindi and Malayalam languages in 4000 screens in India. Lyca Productions acquired the theatrical rights for Tamil Nadu. The Hindi distrbution rights of the film was acquired by Anand Pandit. Telugu rights were bagged by Sudhakar Reddy Ruchira Entertainments and N Cinemas banner. Chandru himself will distribute the Kannada version.

Reception

Box office 
The film collected  on it's opening day domestically.

Critical response 
Kabzaa received mixed to negative reviews from critics. 

Harish Basavarajaiah of The Times of India gave 3.5 out of 5 stars and wrote "There are many one-liners and punching dialogues which play to the gallery. Shivarajkumar’s entry in the climax brings another twist in the tale and is one of the main points in the movie. The story, visual presentation, and ensemble cast makes the movie worth watching."
Bhuvanesh Chandar of The Hindu wrote "Upendra’s gangster drama is similar to ‘KGF’ in more than just the looks, flavour, and genre; it’s a rip-off loaded with empty shells of everything that made Prashanth Neel's films enjoyable"

Yatamanyu Narain of News 18 gave 3 out of 5 stars and wrote "Kabzaa is the right film for you if you are craving to see an anti-hero like Rocky Bhai wreak havoc on the enemies in a full-fledged commercial set-up weaved with the help of adrenaline-pumping action sequences, edge-of-the-seat thrill, and larger than life characters. You’re bound to enjoy the twists and turns and the climax will leave you wanting for more."
Vivek M V of Deccan Herald gave 2 out of 5 stars and wrote "Kabzaa' is a clueless film with little emphasis on emotional resonance. For all its showboating notwithstanding, it lacks a soul to make us care for it." Saketh Reddy Eleti of ABP Desam gave 2 out of 5 stars and wrote "Kabzaa is a poor imitation of KGF where nothing works out. Climax has absurd ending and Telugu dubbing was bad.

123telugu gave 2 out of 5 stars and wrote "On the whole, Kabzaa is a loud and boring period action drama that fails to live up to its expectations. Upendra and the cinematography are the only solaces in this tiresome flick. The routine story, uninteresting narrative, and lack of emotions make it a disappointing fare. You can comfortably skip this film."
Haricharan Pudipeddi of Hindustan Times wrote "The film has nearly half a dozen villain characters but not even one among them manages to impress. Even on the action front, the stunts are too exaggerated to even make us root for Upendra, who sleepwalks through a role that’s interesting on paper but isn’t written in a way that it could become as popular as Yash’s Rocky from the K.G.F franchise. Both the roles – which are about a common man’s rise to the top - have so much in common but Arkeshwara feels lifeless." Prathibha Joy of OTTplay gave a negative review of 1.5 out of 5 stars and wrote "Kabzaa ends with the promise of a sequel. Trouble is that the original itself is so lacklustre that no one is going to line up to watch Kabzaa 2, if and when it gets to theatres." Maalai Malar critic gave mixture of review and gave 2.75 rating out of 5

References

External links 
 

2023 films
2020s Indian films
2020s Kannada-language films
Indian gangster films
2020s action drama films
Indian action drama films
Indian thriller drama films